Fruela de Cantabria or Fruela Pérez (died  758) was the second son of Duke Peter of Cantabria and brother of King Alfonso I of Asturias.

Biographical sketch 
According to the  Rotensis and Sebastianense versions of the Chronicle of Alfonso III, Fruela accompanied his brother King Alfonso in the incursions against the Muslim invaders and succeeded in conquering several cities, including Lugo, Tui, Oporto, Braga, Viseu, Chaves, Ledesma, and other places.

Issue 

The name of the mother of Fruela's children is not known.  These were:
 Bermudo I of Asturias;.
 Aurelius of Asturias. 
 A daughter whose name is unknown who married a noble from Álava named Lope with whom she had a son García and a daughter, Munia of Álava, the wife of King Fruela I of Asturias.

Notes

References

Bibliography

External links
 Latin text of the Chronica Rotensis
 Latin text of the Chronica ad Sebastianum

Counts of Spain
8th-century Visigothic people
8th-century Asturian nobility

Gothic warriors
People of the Reconquista
8th-century births
750s deaths
Year of birth unknown
Year of death uncertain